Fogón Cocina Mexicana is a Mexican restaurant in Seattle's Capitol Hill neighborhood, in the United States.

Description and history
The restaurant has a 110-person capacity, The interior features "bamboo tables and benches, and a tortilla-making station that's pretty damn cool".

Fogón operated via takeout and delivery during the COVID-19 pandemic.

Reception
The Seattle Post-Intelligencer has called Fogón the neighborhood's most popular Mexican restaurant. Seattle Magazine included Fogón in a 2014 list of the city's best Mexican restaurants and said, "Mexican food lovers who want a little privacy and less of a scene on Capitol Hill will find solace in the unpretentious Fogón, with the bar separated from the restaurant to make drinkers and families equally comfortable." Seattle Metropolitan Kathryn Robinson described the food as "not terribly" authentic, "but so cheap and tasty that nobody cares". The magazine's Allecia Vermillion included the restaurant in a 2021 list of "The Best Restaurants on Capitol Hill".

References

External links

 
 

Capitol Hill, Seattle
Mexican restaurants in Seattle